The Los Angeles Lakers are an American professional basketball team based in Los Angeles, California. They play in the Pacific Division of the Western Conference in the National Basketball Association (NBA). The Lakers' franchise was founded in 1947 in Detroit, Michigan before moving to Minneapolis, Minnesota, where the team got its official title from the state's nickname, "Land of 10,000 Lakes". The Minneapolis Lakers won five NBA Finals before relocating to Los Angeles in the 1960–61 NBA season, becoming the first West Coast team in league history. In the 1960s, the Lakers reached the NBA Finals six times, but lost every series to the Boston Celtics, beginning their long and storied rivalry. In 1972, with future Hall of Famers Wilt Chamberlain, Gail Goodrich, and Jerry West, the Lakers compiled a 33-game winning streak, the longest streak in U.S. professional team sports, and won their sixth title under coach Bill Sharman. The Lakers' popularity soared in the 1980s when they won five additional championships during a nine-year span with the help of Hall of Famers Magic Johnson, Kareem Abdul-Jabbar, James Worthy and coach Pat Riley, the franchise's all-time leader in both regular season and playoff games coached and wins. Two of those championships during that span were against their arch-rivals, the Boston Celtics. With the team of Shaquille O'Neal, Kobe Bryant and Hall of Fame coach Phil Jackson, the Lakers played in four of the first five NBA Finals of the 21st century; winning three consecutively from 2000 to 2002, and losing the fourth in 2004. The Lakers would then conclude the decade with three straight Finals appearances; losing to the Boston Celtics in 2008 but then prevailing with back-to-back championships against the Orlando Magic in 2009 and the Boston Celtics in 2010. The 2010 championship marks the 16th NBA championship in Lakers franchise history. The Lakers would claim their first championship led by LeBron James and Anthony Davis in 2020 after defeating the Miami Heat, marking the 17th and tying the Celtics.

The list is composed of players who played at least one game for the Lakers franchise.



Players
Note: Statistics are correct through the end of the  season.

A to B

|-
|align="left" bgcolor="#FFFF99"|^ (#33) || align="center"|C || align="left"|UCLA || align="center"|14 || align="center"|– || 1,093 || 37,492 || 10,279 || 3,652 || 24,176 || 34.3 || 9.4 || 3.3 || 22.1 || align=center|
|-
|align="left"| || align="center"|F || align="left"|Indiana || align="center"|2 || align="center"|– || 143 || 2,695 || 556 || 199 || 932 || 18.8 || 3.9 || 1.4 || 6.5 || align=center|
|-
|align="left"| || align="center"|C || align="left"|Fresno State || align="center"|1 || align="center"| || 20 || 174 || 50 || 2 || 31 || 8.7 || 2.5 || 0.1 || 1.6 || align=center|
|-
|align="left"| || align="center"|G || align="left"|UCLA || align="center"|3 || align="center"|– || 210 || 6,881 || 712 || 1,081 || 3,351 || 32.8 || 3.4 || 5.1 || 16.0 || align=center|
|-
|align="left"| || align="center"|G/F || align="left"|Saint Joseph's || align="center"|2 || align="center"|– || 53 || 383 || 55 || 48 || 161 || 7.2 || 1.0 || 0.9 || 3.0 || align=center|
|-
|align="left"| || align="center"|F || align="left"|UCLA || align="center"|2 || align="center"|– || 106 || 2,430 || 436 || 181 || 885 || 22.9 || 4.1 || 1.7 || 8.3 || align=center|
|-
|align="left"| || align="center"|G || align="left"|South Florida || align="center"|1 || align="center"| || 82 || 2,903 || 197 || 358 || 1,115 || 35.4 || 2.4 || 4.4 || 13.6 || align=center|
|-
|align="left"| || align="center"|G || align="left"|UCLA || align="center"|2 || align="center"|– || 99 || 3,203 || 611 || 631 || 993 || 32.4 || 6.2 || 6.4 || 10.0 || align=center|
|-
|align="left"| || align="center"|F/C || align="left"|UTEP || align="center"|2 || align="center"|– || 122 || 2,111 || 661 || 74 || 823 || 17.3 || 5.4 || 0.6 || 6.7 || align=center|
|-
|align="left"| || align="center"|F || align="left"|UCLA || align="center"|2 || align="center"|– || 116 || 2,460 || 572 || 197 || 847 || 21.2 || 4.9 || 1.7 || 7.3 || align=center|
|-
|align="left"| || align="center"|G/F || align="left"|Tennessee State || align="center"|3 || align="center"|– || 232 || 7,190 || 692 || 621 || 3,890 || 31.0 || 3.0 || 2.7 || 16.8 || align=center|
|-
|align="left"| || align="center"|G || align="left"|Georgia Tech || align="center"|1 || align="center"| || 49 || 374 || 37 || 51 || 121 || 7.6 || 0.8 || 1.0 || 2.5 || align=center|
|-
|align="left"| || align="center"|F || align="left"|LSU || align="center"|1 || align="center"| || 66 || 1,342 || 285 || 74 || 473 || 20.3 || 4.3 || 1.1 || 7.2 || align=center|
|-
|align="left"| || align="center"|G || align="left"|Kentucky State || align="center"|1 || align="center"| || 4 || 27 || 1 || 0 || 5 || 6.8 || 0.3 || 0.0 || 1.3 || align=center|
|-
|align="left" bgcolor="#FFFF99"|^ (#22) || align="center"|F || align="left"|Seattle || align="center"|14 || align="center"|– || 846 || 33,863 || bgcolor="#CFECEC"|11,463 || 3,650 || 23,149 || 40.0 || 13.5 || 4.3 || bgcolor="#CFECEC"|27.4 || align=center|
|-
|align="left"| || align="center"|G/F || align="left"|Old Dominion || align="center"|1 || align="center"||| 23 || 643 || 77 || 71 || 302 || 28.0 || 3.3 || 3.1 || 13.1 || align=center|
|-
|align="left"| || align="center"|F || align="left"|West Virginia || align="center"|1 || align="center"| || 11 ||  || 25 || 2 || 22 ||  || 2.3 || 0.2 || 2.0 || align=center|
|-
|align="left"| || align="center"|F || align="left"|Kansas State || align="center"|1 || align="center"| || 26 || 277 || 60 || 25 || 181 || 10.7 || 2.3 || 1.0 || 7.0 || align=center|
|-
|align="left" bgcolor="#FFFF99"|^ || align="center"|C || align="left"|Prairie View A&M || align="center"|1 || align="center"| || 69 || 1,213 || 327 || 74 || 380 || 17.6 || 4.7 || 1.1 || 5.5 || align=center|
|-
|align="left"| || align="center"|C || align="left"|Creighton || align="center"|1 || align="center"| || 28 || 306 || 96 || 10 || 126 || 10.9 || 3.4 || 0.4 || 4.5 || align=center|
|-
|align="left"| || align="center"|F || align="left"|Arizona State || align="center"|1 || align="center"| || 45 || 354 || 126 || 18 || 177 || 7.9 || 2.8 || 0.4 || 3.9 || align=center|
|-
|align="left"| || align="center"|F/C || align="left"|Kansas || align="center"|3 || align="center"|– || 144 || 2,390 || 741 || 89 || 790 || 16.6 || 5.1 || 0.6 || 5.5 || align=center|
|-
|align="left"| || align="center"|F || align="left"|Monmouth || align="center"|1 || align="center"| || 27 || 109 || 23 || 7 || 34 || 4.0 || 0.9 || 0.3 || 1.3 || align=center|
|-
|align="left"| || align="center"|G || align="left"|Maryland || align="center"|4 || align="center"|– || 204 || 4,884 || 476 || 723 || 1,178 || 23.9 || 2.3 || 3.5 || 5.8 || align=center|
|-
|align="left"| || align="center"|F/C || align="left"|USC || align="center"|1 || align="center"| || 22 || 118 || 45 || 5 || 64 || 5.4 || 2.0 || 0.2 || 2.9 || align=center|
|-
|align="left"| || align="center"|F/C || align="left"|Temple || align="center"|1 || align="center"| || 24 ||  ||  || 15 || 55 ||  ||  || 0.6 || 2.3 || align=center|
|-
|align="left"| || align="center"|F || align="left"|Cincinnati || align="center"|4 || align="center"|– || 199 || 2,915 || 790 || 116 || 709 || 14.6 || 4.0 || 0.6 || 3.6 || align=center|
|-
|align="left"| || align="center"|G || align="left"|Marquette || align="center"|2 || align="center"| || 7 || 119 || 10 || 11 || 25 || 17.0 || 1.4 || 1.6 || 3.6 || align=center|
|-
|align="left"| || align="center"|G || align="left"|Cincinnati || align="center"|1 || align="center"| || 2 || 12 || 3 || 0 || 5 || 6.0 || 1.5 || 0.0 || 2.5 || align=center|
|-
|align="left"| || align="center"|C || align="left"|Utah || align="center"|1 || align="center"| || 24 || 216 || 78 || 15 || 36 || 9.0 || 3.3 || 0.6 || 1.5 || align=center|
|-
|align="left"| || align="center"|G || align="left"| Skyliners Frankfurt || align="center"|1 || align="center"| || 22 || 120 || 25 || 15 || 19 || 5.5 || 1.1 || 0.7 || 0.9 || align=center|
|-
|align="left"| || align="center"|G/F || align="left"|Idaho State || align="center"|2 || align="center"|– || 88 || 1,689 || 156 || 161 || 642 || 19.2 || 1.8 || 1.8 || 7.3 || align=center|
|-
|align="left"| || align="center"|F || align="left"|Kansas State || align="center"|1 || align="center"| || 78 || 1,847 || 548 || 87 || 955 || 23.7 || 7.0 || 1.1 || 12.2 || align=center|
|-
|align="left"| || align="center"|F/C || align="left"|Duke || align="center"|1 || align="center"| || 71 || 1,692 || 482 || 95 || 836 || 23.8 || 6.8 || 1.3 || 11.8 || align=center|
|-
|align="left"| || align="center"|F/C || align="left"|Kentucky || align="center"|2 || align="center"|– || 92 || 1,781 || 419 || 165 || 529 || 19.4 || 4.6 || 1.8 || 5.8 || align=center|
|-
|align="left"| || align="center"|G/F || align="left"|Maryland || align="center"|1 || align="center"| || 32 || 219 || 53 || 16 || 138 || 6.8 || 1.7 || 0.5 || 4.3 || align=center|
|-
|align="left"| || align="center"|G/F || align="left"|Florida || align="center"|2 || align="center"|– || 78 || 1,052 || 145 || 77 || 327 || 13.5 || 1.9 || 1.0 || 4.2 || align=center|
|-
|align="left"| || align="center"|F/C || align="left"|Minnesota || align="center"|2 || align="center"|– || 149 || 2,073 || 545 || 97 || 387 || 13.9 || 3.7 || 0.7 || 2.6 || align=center|
|-
|align="left"| || align="center"|F/C || align="left"|Penn State || align="center"|1 || align="center"| || 37 || 404 || 97 || 12 || 146 || 10.9 || 2.6 || 0.3 || 3.9 || align=center|
|-
|align="left"| || align="center"|F/C || align="left"|Kansas || align="center"|3 || align="center"|– || 154 || 4,610 || 1,375 || 371 || 1,309 || 29.9 || 8.9 || 2.4 || 8.5 || align=center|
|-
|align="left"| || align="center"|G/F || align="left"|Providence || align="center"|1 || align="center"| || 18 || 228 || 30 || 21 || 115 || 12.7 || 1.7 || 1.2 || 6.4 || align=center|
|-
|align="left"| || align="center"|G/F || align="left"|Stanford || align="center"|1 || align="center"| || 29 || 599 || 70 || 19 || 115 || 20.7 || 2.4 || 0.7 || 4.0 || align=center|
|-
|align="left"| || align="center"|F || align="left"|NC State || align="center"|1 || align="center"| || 36 || 381 || 76 || 23 || 135 || 10.6 || 2.1 || 0.6 || 3.8 || align=center|
|-
|align="left"| || align="center"|F || align="left"|Wayne State || align="center"|1 || align="center"| || 1 || 6 || 1 || 0 || 1 || 6.0 || 1.0 || 0.0 || 1.0 || align=center|
|-
|align="left"| || align="center"|G || align="left"|Missouri || align="center"|1 || align="center"| || 19 || 568 || 36 || 40 || 227 || 29.9 || 1.9 || 2.1 || 11.9 || align=center|
|-
|align="left"| || align="center"|F || align="left"|Glynn Academy (GA) || align="center"|3 || align="center"|– || 136 || 3,619 || 848 || 175 || 1,013 || 26.6 || 6.2 || 1.3 || 7.4 || align=center|
|-
|align="left"| || align="center"|C || align="left"|Kansas || align="center"|1 || align="center"| || 1 || 5 || 0 || 0 || 1 || 5.0 || 0.0 || 0.0 || 1.0 || align=center|
|-
|align="left"| || align="center"|G || align="left"|Michigan State || align="center"|3 || align="center"|– || 182 || 3,404 || 360 || 214 || 1,437 || 18.7 || 2.0 || 1.2 || 7.9 || align=center|
|-
|align="left"| || align="center"|G || align="left"|McNeese State || align="center"|1 || align="center"| || 76 || 1,066 || 93 || 155 || 333 || 14.0 || 1.2 || 2.0 || 4.4 || align=center|
|-
|align="left"| || align="center"|G/F || align="left"|Arkansas || align="center"|1 || align="center"| || 7 || 27 || 4 || 3 || 5 || 3.9 || 0.6 || 0.4 || 0.7 || align=center|
|-
|align="left" bgcolor="#FFCC00"|+ (#8, #24) || align="center"|G/F || align="left"|Lower Merion HS (PA) || align="center" bgcolor="#CFECEC"|20 || align="center"|– || bgcolor="#CFECEC"|1,346 || bgcolor="#CFECEC"|48,637 || 7,047 || 6,306 || bgcolor="#CFECEC"|33,643 || 36.1 || 5.2 || 4.7 || 25.0 || align=center|
|-
|align="left"| || align="center"|C || align="left"|Indiana || align="center"|1 || align="center"| || 15 || 72 || 17 || 6 || 22 || 4.8 || 1.1 || 0.4 || 1.5 || align=center|
|-
|align="left"| || align="center"|G || align="left"|North Carolina || align="center"|1 || align="center"| || 18 || 75 || 7 || 10 || 23 || 4.2 || 0.4 || 0.6 || 1.3 || align=center|
|-
|align="left"| || align="center"|G/F || align="left"|North Carolina || align="center"|1 || align="center"| || 19 || 524 || 50 || 20 || 177 || 27.6 || 2.6 || 1.1 || 9.3 || align=center|
|-
|align="left"| || align="center"|F/C || align="left"|Kentucky || align="center"|1 || align="center"| || 14 || 171 || 64 || 6 || 55 || 12.2 || 4.6 || 0.4 || 3.9 || align=center|
|-
|align="left"| || align="center"|F || align="left"|UConn || align="center"|1 || align="center"| || 77 || 2,746 || 450 || 146 || 1,195 || 35.7 || 5.8 || 1.9 || 15.5 || align=center|
|-
|align="left"| || align="center"|G || align="left"|Marquette || align="center"|1 || align="center"| || 6 || 123 || 12 || 14 || 52 || 20.5 || 2.0 || 2.3 || 8.7 || align=center|
|-
|align="left" bgcolor="#FFCC00"|+ || align="center"|C || align="left"|St. Joseph HS (NJ) || align="center"|7 || align="center"|– || 392 || 10,174 || 3,076 || 461 || 4,597 || 26.0 || 7.8 || 1.2 || 11.7 || align=center|
|-
|align="left"| || align="center"|F || align="left"|Syracuse || align="center"|1 || align="center"| || 32 || 194 || 27 || 13 || 63 || 6.1 || 0.8 || 0.4 || 2.0 || align=center|
|}

C

|-
|align="left"| || align="center"|G || align="left"| Saski Baskonia || align="center"|1 || align="center"| || 24 || 292 || 42 || 51 || 80 || 12.2 || 1.8 || 2.1 || 3.3 || align=center|
|-
|align="left" | || align="center"|G || align="left"|Georgia || align="center"|2 || align="center"|– || 156 || 4,493 || 625 || 272 || 1,930 || 28.8 || 4.0 || 1.7 || 12.4 || align=center|
|-
|align="left"| || align="center"|F || align="left"|Penn || align="center"|2 || align="center"|– || 133 || 3,086 || 577 || 160 || 693 || 23.2 || 4.3 || 1.2 || 5.2 || align=center|
|-
|align="left"| || align="center"|G || align="left"|Michigan || align="center"|1 || align="center"| || 7 || 58 || 5 || 12 || 11 || 8.3 || 0.7 || 1.7 || 1.6 || align=center|
|-
|align="left"| || align="center"|G || align="left"|USC || align="center"|1 || align="center"| || 12 || 207 || 16 || 21 || 95 || 17.3 || 1.3 || 1.8 || 7.9 || align=center|
|-
|align="left"| || align="center"|C || align="left"|Clemson || align="center"|9 || align="center"|– || 618 || 15,460 || 3,604 || 688 || 6,408 || 25.0 || 5.8 || 1.1 || 10.4 || align=center|
|-
|align="left"| || align="center"|G/F || align="left"|Ohio State || align="center"|2 || align="center"|– || 76 || 1,029 || 157 || 62 || 531 || 13.5 || 2.1 || 0.8 || 7.0 || align=center|
|-
|align="left"| || align="center"|F || align="left"|UTEP || align="center"|1 || align="center"| || 41 || 215 || 43 || 7 || 81 || 5.2 || 1.0 || 0.2 || 2.0 || align=center|
|-
|align="left"| || align="center"|G/F || align="left"|Minnesota || align="center"|2 || align="center"|– || 112 ||  ||  || 246 || 775 ||  ||  || 2.2 || 6.9 || align=center|
|-
|align="left"| || align="center"|G || align="left"|Bradley || align="center"|1 || align="center"| || 19 || 244 || 45 || 16 || 69 || 12.8 || 2.4 || 0.8 || 3.6 || align=center|
|-
|align="left"| || align="center"|F || align="left"|NC State || align="center"|3 || align="center"|– || 129 || 1,939 || 517 || 87 || 872 || 15.0 || 4.0 || 0.7 || 6.8 || align=center|
|-
|align="left"| || align="center"|G || align="left"|Indiana || align="center"|1 || align="center"| || 54 || 672 || 65 || 52 || 301 || 12.4 || 1.2 || 1.0 || 5.6 || align=center|
|-
|align="left"| || align="center"|G || align="left"|LSU || align="center"|1 || align="center"| || 4 || 50 || 3 || 2 || 22 || 12.5 || 0.8 || 0.5 || 5.5 || align=center|
|-
|align="left"| || align="center"|G || align="left"|VMI || align="center"|1 || align="center"| || 46 || 332 || 45 || 25 || 144 || 7.2 || 1.0 || 0.5 || 3.1 || align=center|
|-
|align="left"| || align="center"|F || align="left"|Oregon State || align="center"|1 || align="center"| || 28 || 192 || 58 || 11 || 76 || 6.9 || 2.1 || 0.4 || 2.7 || align=center|
|-
|align="left" | || align="center"|G || align="left"|Texas A&M || align="center"|2 || align="center"|– || 62 || 1,093 || 132 || 152 || 363 || 17.6 || 2.1 || 2.5 || 5.9 || align=center|
|-
|align="left" bgcolor="#FFCC00"|+ || align="center"|F || align="left"|Cal State Fullerton || align="center"|3 || align="center"|– || 144 || 4,936 || 1,053 || 239 || 3,003 || 34.3 || 7.3 || 1.7 || 20.9 || align=center|
|-
|align="left"| || align="center"|G || align="left"|Villanova || align="center"|1 || align="center"| || 16 || 185 || 11 || 20 || 37 || 11.6 || 0.7 || 1.3 || 2.3 || align=center|
|-
|align="left" bgcolor="#FFFF99"|^ (#13) || align="center"|C || align="left"|Kansas || align="center"|5 || align="center"|– || 339 || 14,815 || 6,524 || 1,461 || 5,985 || bgcolor="#CFECEC"|43.7 || bgcolor="#CFECEC"|19.2 || 4.3 || 17.7 || align=center|
|-
|align="left"| || align="center"|F || align="left"|Utah || align="center"|1 || align="center"| || 69 || 1,015 || 208 || 44 || 516 || 14.7 || 3.0 || 0.6 || 7.5 || align=center|
|-
|align="left"| || align="center"|C || align="left"|Dominguez (CA) || align="center"|1 || align="center"| || 48 || 786 || 268 || 31 || 147 || 16.4 || 5.6 || 0.6 || 3.1 || align=center|
|-
|align="left"| || align="center"|G || align="left"|Houston || align="center"|2 || align="center"|– || 90 || 2,541 || 341 || 325 || 527 || 28.2 || 3.8 || 3.6 || 5.9 || align=center|
|-
|align="left"| || align="center"|F/C || align="left"|Marquette || align="center"|2 || align="center"|– || 164 || 4,956 || 1,221 || 304 || 1,751 || 30.2 || 7.4 || 1.9 || 10.7 || align=center|
|-
|align="left"| || align="center"|G/F || align="left"|Pepperdine || align="center"|2 || align="center"|– || 88 || 1,847 || 286 || 189 || 814 || 21.0 || 3.3 || 2.1 || 9.3 || align=center|
|-
|align="left" bgcolor="#FFCC00"|+ || align="center"|G || align="left"|Minnesota || align="center"|2 || align="center"|– || 157 || 4,802 || 560 || 558 || 2,410 || 30.6 || 3.6 || 3.6 || 15.4 || align=center|
|-
|align="left"| || align="center"|F || align="left"|Louisville || align="center"|1 || align="center"| || 59 || 1,363 || 325 || 65 || 428 || 23.1 || 5.5 || 1.1 || 7.3 || align=center|
|-
|align="left"| || align="center"|G || align="left"|Missouri || align="center"|4 || align="center"|– || 273 || 7,681 || 909 || 784 || 3,904 || 28.1 || 3.3 || 2.9 || 14.3 || align=center|
|-
|align="left"| || align="center"|G || align="left"|Ohio State || align="center"|1 || align="center"| || 38 || 201 || 39 || 35 || 98 || 5.3 || 1.0 || 0.9 || 2.6 || align=center|
|-
|align="left"| || align="center"|G || align="left"|Oregon State || align="center"|1 || align="center"| || 2 || 5 || 0 || 0 || 2 || 2.5 || 0.0 || 0.0 || 1.0 || align=center|
|-
|align="left"| || align="center"|F || align="left"|Illinois || align="center"|5 || align="center"|– || 259 || 4,152 || 816 || 197 || 1,719 || 16.0 || 3.2 || 0.8 || 6.6 || align=center|
|-
|align="left"| || align="center"|G || align="left"|USC || align="center"|1 || align="center"| || 65 || 645 || 50 || 150 || 156 || 9.9 || 0.8 || 2.3 || 2.4 || align=center|
|-
|align="left"| || align="center"|F/C || align="left"|Colorado || align="center"|1 || align="center"| || 2 || 11 || 2 || 0 || 2 || 5.5 || 1.0 || 0.0 || 1.0 || align=center|
|-
|align="left"| || align="center"|G/F || align="left"|New Mexico || align="center"|12 || align="center"|– || 873 || 23,635 || 2,769 || 3,666 || 7,729 || 27.1 || 3.2 || 4.2 || 8.9 || align=center|
|-
|align="left"| || align="center"|F/C || align="left"|Oregon State || align="center"|6 || align="center"|–– || 375 || 7,425 || 2,587 || 546 || 3,643 || 19.8 || 6.9 || 1.5 || 9.7 || align=center|
|-
|align="left"| || align="center"|G/F || align="left"|St. Bonaventure || align="center"|2 || align="center"|– || 119 || 2,446 || 327 || 249 || 897 || 20.6 || 2.7 || 2.1 || 7.5 || align=center|
|-
|align="left"| || align="center"|G || align="left"|Penn State || align="center"|1 || align="center"| || 6 || 27 || 1 || 2 || 10 || 4.5 || 0.2 || 0.3 || 1.7 || align=center|
|-
|align="left"| || align="center"|G || align="left"|Georgia Tech || align="center"|1 || align="center"| || 22 || 171 || 21 || 18 || 72 || 7.8 || 1.0 || 0.8 || 3.3 || align=center|
|}

D to E

|-
|align="left"| || align="center"|G || align="left"|Mt. SAC || align="center"|1 || align="center"| || 25 || 541 || 56 || 36 || 185 || 21.6 || 2.2 || 1.4 || 7.4 || align=center|
|-
|align="left" bgcolor="#FFFF99"|^ || align="center"|G/F || align="left"|Notre Dame || align="center"|2 || align="center"|– || 116 || 3,760 || 746 || 326 || 2,128 || 32.4 || 6.4 || 2.8 || 18.3 || align=center|
|-
|align="left"| || align="center"|G || align="left"|Maryland || align="center"|2 || align="center"|– || 38 || 399 || 36 || 92 || 101 || 10.5 || 0.9 || 2.4 || 2.7 || align=center|
|-
|align="left"| || align="center"|F || align="left"|North Carolina || align="center"|1 || align="center"| || 79 || 1,840 || 600 || 94 || 656 || 23.3 || 7.6 || 1.2 || 8.3 || align=center|
|-
|align="left"| || align="center"|F || align="left"|Duke || align="center"|2 || align="center"|– || 57 || 1,499 || 295 || 75 || 427 || 26.3 || 5.2 || 1.3 || 7.5 || align=center|
|-
|align="left"| || align="center"|G || align="left"|George Washington || align="center"|1 || align="center"| || 70 || 1,248 || 132 || 167 || 473 || 17.8 || 1.9 || 2.4 || 6.8 || align=center|
|-
|align="left"| || align="center"|G || align="left"|Providence || align="center"|1 || align="center"| || 25 || 332 || 23 || 71 || 98 || 13.3 || 0.9 || 2.8 || 3.9 || align=center|
|-
|align="left" bgcolor="#FFFF99"|^ || align="center"|C || align="left"| Partizan || align="center"|8 || align="center"|– || 535 || 15,517 || 4,545 || 1,375 || 6,531 || 29.0 || 8.5 || 2.6 || 12.2 || align=center|
|-
|align="left"| || align="center"|G || align="left"|Missouri || align="center"|2 || align="center"|– || 128 || 1,829 || 132 || 335 || 557 || 14.3 || 1.0 || 2.6 || 4.4 || align=center|
|-
|align="left"| || align="center"|G || align="left"|Duke || align="center"|1 || align="center"| || 46 || 820 || 68 || 133 || 133 || 17.8 || 1.5 || 2.9 || 2.9 || align=center|
|-
|align="left"| || align="center"|C || align="left"|Seton Hall || align="center"|1 || align="center"| || 71 || 1,866 || 794 || 54 || 720 || 26.3 || 11.2 || 0.8 || 10.1 || align=center|
|-
|align="left"| || align="center"|G/F || align="left"|Loyola (IL) || align="center"|1 || align="center"| || 60 ||  ||  || 129 || 276 ||  ||  || 2.2 || 4.6 || align=center|
|-
|align="left"| || align="center"|F || align="left"|West Virginia || align="center"|3 || align="center"|– || 63 || 711 || 122 || 24 || 224 || 11.3 || 1.9 || 0.4 || 3.6 || align=center|
|-
|align="left"| || align="center"|F/C || align="left"|Washington || align="center"|3 || align="center"|– || 122 || 1,809 || 345 || 92 || 908 || 14.8 || 2.8 || 0.8 || 7.4 || align=center|
|-
|align="left"| || align="center"|G || align="left"|Providence || align="center"|2 || align="center"|– || 154 || 3,432 || 251 || 431 || 1,225 || 22.3 || 1.6 || 2.8 || 8.0 || align=center|
|-
|align="left"| || align="center"|C || align="left"|West Texas A&M || align="center"|1 || align="center"| || 3 ||  ||  || 0 || 2 ||  ||  || 0.0 || 0.7 || align=center|
|-
|align="left"| || align="center"|G || align="left"|North Carolina || align="center"|1 || align="center"| || 65 || 1,675 || 210 || 105 || 650 || 25.8 || 3.2 || 1.6 || 10.0 || align=center|
|-
|align="left"| || align="center"|F || align="left"|Niagara || align="center"|2 || align="center"|– || 118 || 1,873 || 616 || 86 || 607 || 15.9 || 5.2 || 0.7 || 5.1 || align=center|
|-
|align="left"| || align="center"|F/C || align="left"|St. John's || align="center"|6 || align="center"|–– || 402 || 8,569 || 2,746 || 259 || 3,249 || 21.3 || 6.8 || 0.6 || 8.1 || align=center|
|-
|align="left"| || align="center"|G || align="left"|Syracuse || align="center"|2 || align="center"|– || 76 || 1,075 || 121 || 157 || 394 || 14.1 || 1.6 || 2.1 || 5.2 || align=center|
|-
|align="left"| || align="center"|F || align="left"|Niagara || align="center"|1 || align="center"| || 18 || 401 || 83 || 26 || 148 || 22.3 || 4.6 || 1.4 || 8.2 || align=center|
|-
|align="left"| || align="center"|G/F || align="left"|UCLA || align="center"|5 || align="center"|– || 309 || 8,183 || 1,392 || 903 || 2,851 || 26.5 || 4.5 || 2.9 || 9.2 || align=center|
|-
|align="left"| || align="center"|G || align="left"|Texas || align="center"|2 || align="center"|– || 83 || 1,828 || 230 || 86 || 669 || 22.0 || 2.8 || 1.0 || 8.1 || align=center|
|-
|align="left"| || align="center"|F || align="left"| Joventut Badalona || align="center"|1 || align="center"| || 1 || 19 || 2 || 1 || 8 || 19.0 || 2.0 || 1.0 || 8.0 || align=center|
|}

F to G

|-
|align="left"| || align="center"|F || align="left"|BYU || align="center"|1 || align="center"| || 30 || 171 || 45 || 11 || 60 || 5.7 || 1.5 || 0.4 || 2.0 || align=center|
|-
|align="left"| || align="center"|G || align="left"|UCLA || align="center"|5 || align="center"|– || 342 || 6,358 || 654 || 843 || 2,492 || 18.6 || 1.9 || 2.5 || 7.3 || align=center|
|-
|align="left"| || align="center"|G || align="left"|DePaul || align="center"|1 || align="center"| || 10 || 59 || 6 || 6 || 30 || 5.9 || 0.6 || 0.6 || 3.0 || align=center|
|-
|align="left"| || align="center"|C || align="left"|LIU Brooklyn || align="center"|3 || align="center"|– || 189 || 3,684 || 1,270 || 121 || 1,206 || 19.5 || 6.7 || 0.6 || 6.4 || align=center|
|-
|align="left"| || align="center"|G/F || align="left"|Utah || align="center"|3 || align="center"|– || 178 ||  || 271 || 278 || 1,037 ||  || 4.0 || 1.6 || 5.8 || align=center|
|-
|align="left"| || align="center"|C || align="left"|Dayton || align="center"|1 || align="center"| || 27 || 141 || 64 || 5 || 41 || 5.2 || 2.4 || 0.2 || 1.5 || align=center|
|-
|align="left"| || align="center"|G || align="left"|Little Rock || align="center"|13 || align="center"|–– || 915 || 23,211 || 1,892 || 2,685 || 7,223 || 25.4 || 2.1 || 2.9 || 7.9 || align=center|
|-
|align="left"| || align="center"|G/F || align="left"|Niagara || align="center"|3 || align="center"|– || 170 || 3,231 || 860 || 266 || 1,265 || 19.0 || 5.1 || 1.6 || 7.4 || align=center|
|-
|align="left"| || align="center"|F || align="left"|UC Santa Barbara || align="center"|5 || align="center"|– || 368 || 7,685 || 1,405 || 523 || 2,618 || 20.9 || 3.8 || 1.4 || 7.1 || align=center|
|-
|align="left"| || align="center"|G || align="left"|NYU || align="center"|1 || align="center"| || 44 ||  ||  || 74 || 179 ||  ||  || 1.7 || 4.1 || align=center|
|-
|align="left"| || align="center"|F/C || align="left"|UTEP || align="center"|1 || align="center"| || 62 || 451 || 112 || 32 || 125 || 7.3 || 1.8 || 0.5 || 2.0 || align=center|
|-
|align="left" bgcolor="#FFCC00"|+ || align="center"|F/C || align="left"|La Salle || align="center"|3 || align="center"|– || 191 || 4,133 || 1,503 || 199 || 2,092 || 28.7 || 10.4 || 1.4 || 11.0 || align=center|
|-
|align="left"| || align="center"|G/F || align="left"|North Carolina || align="center"|7 || align="center"|– || 486 || 12,733 || 1,784 || 1,399 || 4,207 || 26.2 || 3.7 || 2.9 || 8.7 || align=center|
|-
|align="left"| || align="center"|G || align="left"|Illinois || align="center"|1 || align="center"| || 64 || 1,480 || 180 || 171 || 689 || 23.1 || 2.8 || 2.7 || 10.8 || align=center|
|-
|align="left"| || align="center"|F/C || align="left"|Hamline || align="center"|1 || align="center"| || 2 || 8 || 0 || 0 || 1 || 4.0 || 0.0 || 0.0 || 0.5 || align=center|
|-
|align="left"| || align="center"|F/C || align="left"|Arizona || align="center"|1 || align="center"| || 9 || 150 || 25 || 10 || 52 || 16.7 || 2.8 || 1.1 || 5.8 || align=center|
|-
|align="left"| || align="center"|F || align="left"|DePauw || align="center"|1 || align="center"| || 50 ||  ||  || 19 || 89 ||  ||  || 0.4 || 1.8 || align=center|
|-
|align="left" bgcolor="#FFCC00"|+ || align="center"|G/F || align="left"|Minnesota || align="center"|5 || align="center"|– || 324 || 9,172 || 1,347 || 821 || 4,156 || 28.3 || 4.2 || 2.5 || 12.8 || align=center|
|-
|align="left"| || align="center"|F || align="left"|Oral Roberts || align="center"|1 || align="center"| || 41 || 478 || 71 || 31 || 188 || 11.7 || 1.7 || 0.8 || 4.6 || align=center|
|-
|align="left"| || align="center"|G || align="left"|Southern Illinois || align="center"|1 || align="center"| || 73 || 2,318 || 235 || 180 || 846 || 31.8 || 3.2 || 2.5 || 11.6 || align=center|
|-
|align="left" bgcolor="#FFCC00"|+ || align="center"|F/C || align="left"| FC Barcelona || align="center"|7 || align="center"|– || 429 || 15,326 || 4,240 || 1,508 || 7,610 || 35.7 || 9.9 || 3.5 || 17.7 || align=center|
|-
|align="left"| || align="center"|G/F || align="left"|Augsburg || align="center"|7 || align="center"|– || 429 || 8,109 || 1,433 || 428 || 2,572 || 18.9 || 3.3 || 1.0 || 6.0 || align=center|
|-
|align="left"| || align="center"|G || align="left"|Western Carolina || align="center"|1 || align="center"| || 9 || 53 || 4 || 6 || 13 || 5.9 || 0.4 || 0.7 || 1.4 || align=center|
|-
|align="left"| || align="center"|F || align="left"|Loyola Marymount || align="center"|1 || align="center"| || 1 ||  ||  || 0 || 2 ||  ||  || 0.0 || 2.0 || align=center|
|-
|align="left" bgcolor="#FFFF99"|^ (#25) || align="center"|G || align="left"|UCLA || align="center"|9 || align="center"|–– || 687 || 21,765 || 2,081 || 2,863 || 13,044 || 31.7 || 3.0 || 4.2 || 19.0 || align=center|
|-
|align="left"| || align="center"|G || align="left"|College of Charleston || align="center"|2 || align="center"|– || 41 || 425 || 32 || 20 || 175 || 10.4 || 0.8 || 0.5 || 4.3 || align=center|
|-
|align="left"| || align="center"|F || align="left"|Xavier || align="center"|1 || align="center"| || 69 || 1,136 || 257 || 34 || 263 || 16.5 || 3.7 || 0.5 || 3.8 || align=center|
|-
|align="left"| || align="center"|F || align="left"|Minnesota || align="center"|2 || align="center"|– || 96 ||  || 115 || 90 || 249 ||  || 1.9 || 0.9 || 2.6 || align=center|
|-
|align="left"| || align="center"|F/C || align="left"|Clemson || align="center"|2 || align="center"| || 132 || 3,496 || 778 || 192 || 880 || 26.5 || 5.9 || 1.5 || 6.7 || align=center|
|-
|align="left"| || align="center"|F || align="left"|Kentucky State || align="center"|2 || align="center"|– || 36 || 159 || 53 || 7 || 128 || 4.4 || 1.5 || 0.2 || 3.6 || align=center|
|-
|align="left" bgcolor="#FFCC00"|+ || align="center"|F/C || align="left"|Oregon State || align="center"|9 || align="center"|– || 735 || 21,451 || 5,632 || 808 || 7,789 || 29.2 || 7.7 || 1.1 || 10.6 || align=center|
|-
|align="left"| || align="center"|G || align="left"|Hampton || align="center"|1 || align="center"| || 27 || 135 || 24 || 7 || 25 || 5.0 || 0.9 || 0.3 || 0.9 || align=center|
|-
|align="left"| || align="center"|G || align="left"|Loyola Marymount || align="center"|1 || align="center"| || 11 || 33 || 4 || 4 || 14 || 3.0 || 0.4 || 0.4 || 1.3 || align=center|
|-
|align="left"| || align="center"|C || align="left"|Washington || align="center"|1 || align="center"| || 8 || 128 || 38 || 3 || 58 || 16.0 || 4.8 || 0.4 || 7.3 || align=center|
|}

H

|-
|align="left"| || align="center"|F || align="left"|NYU || align="center"|6 || align="center"|– || 394 || 13,670 || 4,885 || 920 || 5,993 || 34.7 || 12.4 || 2.3 || 15.2 || align=center|
|-
|align="left"| || align="center"|F/C || align="left"|UCLA || align="center"|1 || align="center"| || 49 || 394 || 95 || 7 || 76 || 8.0 || 1.9 || 0.1 || 1.6 || align=center|
|-
|align="left"| || align="center"|F || align="left"|Arizona State || align="center"|1 || align="center"| || 44 || 378 || 72 || 30 || 121 || 8.6 || 1.6 || 0.7 || 2.8 || align=center|
|-
|align="left"| || align="center"|F/C || align="left"|Morehead State || align="center"|2 || align="center"|– || 82 || 1,094 || 278 || 43 || 368 || 13.3 || 3.4 || 0.5 || 4.5 || align=center|
|-
|align="left"| || align="center"|F || align="left"|Michigan || align="center"|1 || align="center"| || 22 || 111 || 19 || 3 || 51 || 5.0 || 0.9 || 0.1 || 2.3 || align=center|
|-
|align="left"| || align="center"|G || align="left"|Illinois || align="center"|1 || align="center"| || 45 || 1,120 || 67 || 187 || 309 || 24.9 || 1.5 || 4.2 || 6.9 || align=center|
|-
|align="left"| || align="center"|G/F || align="left"|Miami (OH) || align="center"|2 || align="center"|– || 127 || 3,181 || 503 || 383 || 864 || 25.0 || 4.0 || 3.0 || 6.8 || align=center|
|-
|align="left"| || align="center"|F || align="left"|Gonzaga || align="center"|1 || align="center"| || 2 || 11 || 1 || 1 || 0 || 5.5 || 0.5 || 0.5 || 0.0 || align=center|
|-
|align="left"| || align="center"|G || align="left"|Michigan || align="center"|1 || align="center"| || 9 || 180 || 34 || 11 || 73 || 20.0 || 3.8 || 1.2 || 8.1 || align=center|
|-
|align="left"| || align="center"|G || align="left"|Michigan || align="center"|5 || align="center"|– || 309 || 3,974 || 543 || 730 || 1,754 || 22.7 || 2.2 || 2.4 || 5.7 || align=center|
|-
|align="left"| || align="center"|G || align="left"|Villanova || align="center"|2 || align="center"|– || 130 || 3,176 || 511 || 173 || 1,021 || 24.4 || 3.9 || 1.3 || 7.9 || align=center|
|-
|align="left"| || align="center"|F/C || align="left"|Pfeiffer || align="center"|2 || align="center"|– || 86 || 819 || 161 || 28 || 249 || 9.5 || 1.9 || 0.3 || 2.9 || align=center|
|-
|align="left"| || align="center"|G || align="left"|Notre Dame || align="center"|1 || align="center"| || 42 ||  ||  || 69 || 111 ||  ||  || 1.6 || 2.6 || align=center|
|-
|align="left" bgcolor="#FFFF99"|^ || align="center"|F/C || align="left"|Iowa || align="center"|2 || align="center"|– || 114 || 3,564 || 720 || 499 || 1,255 || 31.3 || 6.3 || 4.4 || 11.0 || align=center|
|-
|align="left"| || align="center"|F || align="left"|Notre Dame || align="center"|6 || align="center"|–– || 454 || 10,984 || 2,579 || 518 || 4,084 || 24.2 || 5.7 || 1.1 || 9.0 || align=center|
|-
|align="left"| || align="center"|G || align="left"|Southern Illinois || align="center"|1 || align="center"| || 33 || 229 || 32 || 23 || 106 || 6.9 || 1.0 || 0.7 || 3.2 || align=center|
|-
|align="left"| || align="center"|F || align="left"|Wisconsin || align="center"|1 || align="center"| || 2 || 11 || 0 || 2 || 3 || 5.5 || 0.0 || 1.0 || 1.5 || align=center|
|-
|align="left" bgcolor="#FFFF99"|^ || align="center"|F/C || align="left"|Detroit Mercy || align="center"|1 || align="center"| || 76 || 1,544 || 346 || 93 || 736 || 20.3 || 4.6 || 1.2 || 9.7 || align=center|
|-
|align="left"| || align="center"|G || align="left"|UCLA || align="center"|3 || align="center"|– || 225 || 4,759 || 561 || 856 || 2,109 || 21.2 || 2.5 || 3.8 || 9.4 || align=center|
|-
|align="left"| || align="center"|F/C || align="left"|New Mexico || align="center"|1 || align="center"| || 1 || 3 || 1 || 0 || 4 || 3.0 || 1.0 || 0.0 || 4.0 || align=center|
|-
|align="left"| || align="center"|G || align="left"|Kansas || align="center"|2 || align="center"|– || 52 || 994 || 118 || 54 || 452 || 19.1 || 2.3 || 1.0 || 8.7 || align=center|
|-
|align="left"| || align="center"|F/C || align="left"|Davidson || align="center"|1 || align="center"| || 59 || 613 || 149 || 37 || 282 || 10.4 || 2.5 || 0.6 || 4.8 || align=center|
|-
|align="left"| || align="center"|F || align="left"|USC || align="center"|2 || align="center"|– || 95 || 1,933 || 473 || 104 || 605 || 20.3 || 5.0 || 1.1 || 6.4 || align=center|
|-
|align="left"| || align="center"|C || align="left"|Georgetown || align="center"|1 || align="center"| || 81 || 1,878 || 398 || 95 || 481 || 23.2 || 4.9 || 1.2 || 5.9 || align=center|
|-
|align="left"| || align="center"|F || align="left"|Northern Colorado || align="center"|1 || align="center"| || 6 || 18 || 1 || 1 || 1 || 3.0 || 0.2 || 0.2 || 0.2 || align=center|
|-
|align="left"| || align="center"|F/C || align="left"|Arizona || align="center"|4 || align="center"|– || 178 || 3,914 || 1,288 || 172 || 1,764 || 22.0 || 7.2 || 1.0 || 9.9 || align=center|
|-
|align="left"| || align="center"|F/C || align="left"|Kansas State || align="center"|4 || align="center"|–– || 200 || 3,005 || 801 || 193 || 766 || 15.0 || 4.0 || 1.0 || 3.8 || align=center|
|-
|align="left"| || align="center"|G || align="left"|UCLA || align="center"|2 || align="center"|– || 79 || 492 || 46 || 45 || 236 || 6.2 || 0.6 || 0.6 || 3.0 || align=center|
|-
|align="left"| || align="center"|G/F || align="left"|Cincinnati || align="center"|4 || align="center"|– || 198 || 3,124 || 583 || 211 || 787 || 15.8 || 2.9 || 1.1 || 4.0 || align=center|
|-
|align="left"| || align="center"|F || align="left"|Dayton || align="center"|1 || align="center"| || 12 || 50 || 6 || 1 || 12 || 4.2 || 0.5 || 0.1 || 1.0 || align=center|
|-
|align="left"| || align="center"|F || align="left"|Indiana || align="center"|1 || align="center"| || 28 || 289 || 71 || 10 || 74 || 10.3 || 2.5 || 0.4 || 2.6 || align=center|
|-
|align="left"| || align="center"|F || align="left"|Alabama || align="center"|7 || align="center"|– || 448 || 11,367 || 2,462 || 986 || 2,842 || 25.4 || 5.5 || 2.2 || 6.3 || align=center|
|-
|align="left" bgcolor="#FBCEB1"|* || align="center"|C || align="left"|SACA (GA) || align="center"|1 || align="center"| || 76 || 2,722 || 945 || 108 || 1,296 || 35.8 || 12.4 || 1.4 || 17.1 || align=center|
|-
|align="left"| || align="center"|G/F || align="left"|Minnesota || align="center"|2 || align="center"|– || 160 || 3,969 || 328 || 334 || 1,891 || 24.8 || 2.1 || 2.1 || 11.8 || align=center|
|-
|align="left"| || align="center"|G || align="left"| Joventut Badalona || align="center"|2 || align="center"|– || 76 || 1,106 || 114 || 234 || 300 || 14.6 || 1.5 || 3.1 || 3.9 || align=center|
|-
|align="left" bgcolor="#FFCC00"|+ || align="center"|G || align="left"|West Virginia || align="center"|6 || align="center"|– || 431 || 9,553 || 1,420 || 1,455 || 3,625 || 22.2 || 3.3 || 3.4 || 8.4 || align=center|
|-
|align="left"| || align="center"|G || align="left"|Jackson State || align="center"|1 || align="center"| || 82 || 1,616 || 121 || 129 || 473 || 19.7 || 1.5 || 1.6 || 5.8 || align=center|
|-
|align="left"| || align="center"|G || align="left"|Hamline || align="center"|2 || align="center"|– || 120 || 723 || 187 || 115 || 302 || 12.1 || 1.6 || 1.0 || 2.5 || align=center|
|}

I to J

|-
|align="left" bgcolor="#FFCC00"|+ || align="center"|C || align="left"|California || align="center"|4 || align="center"|– || 316 || 7,930 || 2,982 || 628 || 2,387 || 25.1 || 9.4 || 2.0 || 7.6 || align=center|
|-
|align="left"| || align="center"|G || align="left"|American || align="center"|2 || align="center"|– || 6 || 79 || 8 || 7 || 24 || 13.2 || 1.3 || 1.2 || 4.0 || align=center|
|-
|align="left"| || align="center"|F || align="left"|Duke || align="center"|3 || align="center"|– || 190 || 6,014 || 897 || 550 || 2,639 || 31.7 || 4.7 || 2.9 || 13.9 || align=center|
|-
|align="left"| || align="center"|F || align="left"|Jackson State || align="center"|1 || align="center"| || 24 || 267 || 116 || 20 || 67 || 11.1 || 4.8 || 0.8 || 2.8 || align=center|
|-
|align="left"| || align="center"|G || align="left"|Ohio State || align="center"|1 || align="center"| || 13 || 92 || 12 || 4 || 22 || 7.1 || 0.9 || 0.3 || 1.7 || align=center|
|-
|align="left"| || align="center"|G || align="left"|Florida State || align="center"|1 || align="center"| || 2 || 14 || 2 || 2 || 2 || 7.0 || 1.0 || 1.0 || 1.0 || align=center|
|-
|align="left"| || align="center"|G/F || align="left"|Minnesota || align="center"|2 || align="center"|– || 5 || 30 || 4 || 2 || 18 || 6.0 || 0.8 || 0.4 || 3.6 || align=center|
|-
|align="left" bgcolor="#FBCEB1"|* || align="center"|G/F || align="left"|St. Vincent–St. Mary HS (OH) || align="center"|1 || align="center"| || 55 || 1,937 || 465 || 454 || 1,505 || 35.2 || 8.5 || 8.3 || bgcolor="#CFECEC"|27.4 || align=center|
|-
|align="left"| || align="center"|F || align="left"|North Carolina || align="center"|1 || align="center"| || 76 || 1,636 || 362 || 50 || 712 || 21.5 || 4.8 || 0.7 || 9.4 || align=center|
|-
|align="left"| || align="center"|G/F || align="left"|Minnesota || align="center"|3 || align="center"|– || 183 ||  || 131 || 190 || 824 ||  || 2.1 || 1.0 || 4.5 || align=center|
|-
|align="left"| || align="center"|G || align="left"|Missouri || align="center"|2 || align="center"|– || 55 || 512 || 81 || 31 || 169 || 9.3 || 1.5 || 0.6 || 3.1 || align=center|
|-
|align="left" bgcolor="#FFFF99"|^ (#32) || align="center"|G/F || align="left"|Michigan State || align="center"|13 || align="center"|– || 906 || 33,245 || 6,559 || bgcolor="#CFECEC"|10,141 || 17,707 || 36.7 || 7.2 || bgcolor="#CFECEC"|11.2 || 19.5 || align=center|
|-
|align="left"| || align="center"|F || align="left"|Minnesota || align="center"|1 || align="center"| || 8 || 43 || 15 || 1 || 6 || 5.4 || 1.9 || 0.1 || 0.8 || align=center|
|-
|align="left"| || align="center"|G || align="left"|Jackson State || align="center"|1 || align="center"| || 1 || 13 || 0 || 0 || 6 || 13.0 || 0.0 || 0.0 || 6.0 || align=center|
|-
|align="left"| || align="center"|G/F || align="left"|Syracuse || align="center"|2 || align="center"|– || 155 || 4,485 || 667 || 248 || 1,468 || 28.9 || 4.3 || 1.6 || 9.5 || align=center|
|-
|align="left"| || align="center"|G || align="left"|Marquette || align="center"|1 || align="center"| || 4 || 6 || 4 || 1 || 0 || 1.5 || 1.0 || 0.3 || 0.0 || align=center|
|-
|align="left"| || align="center"|F/C || align="left"|Ohio || align="center"|3 || align="center"|– || 138 || 1,739 || 586 || 112 || 388 || 12.6 || 4.2 || 0.8 || 2.8 || align=center|
|-
|align="left"| || align="center"|F/C || align="left"|Houston || align="center"|1 || align="center"| || 32 || 491 || 114 || 22 || 156 || 15.3 || 3.6 || 0.7 || 4.9 || align=center|
|-
|align="left"| || align="center"|C || align="left"|District of Columbia || align="center"|1 || align="center"| || 2 || 7 || 0 || 0 || 0 || 3.5 || 0.0 || 0.0 || 0.0 || align=center|
|-
|align="left" bgcolor="#FFCC00"|+ || align="center"|G/F || align="left"|Temple || align="center"|5 || align="center"|– || 314 || 10,797 || 1,186 || 951 || 4,784 || 34.4 || 3.8 || 3.0 || 15.2 || align=center|
|-
|align="left"| || align="center"|F || align="left"|New Mexico State || align="center"|1 || align="center"| || 6 || 143 || 49 || 13 || 27 || 23.8 || 8.2 || 2.2 || 4.5 || align=center|
|-
|align="left"| || align="center"|F || align="left"|Georgia || align="center"|1 || align="center"| || 76 || 1,830 || 398 || 65 || 577 || 24.1 || 5.2 || 0.9 || 7.6 || align=center|
|-
|align="left"| || align="center"|G || align="left"|Rutgers || align="center"|4 || align="center"|– || 156 || 1,955 || 153 || 411 || 631 || 12.5 || 1.0 || 2.6 || 4.0 || align=center|
|-
|align="left"| || align="center"|G || align="left"|New Mexico State || align="center"|1 || align="center"| || 23 || 259 || 67 || 26 || 125 || 11.3 || 2.9 || 1.1 || 5.4 || align=center|
|-
|align="left"| || align="center"|G/F || align="left"|DePaul || align="center"|1 || align="center"| || 48 ||  ||  || 33 || 106 ||  ||  || 0.7 || 2.2 || align=center|
|}

K to L

|-
|align="left"| || align="center"|G || align="left"|DePaul || align="center"|1 || align="center"| || 19 ||  ||  || 12 || 47 ||  ||  || 0.6 || 2.5 || align=center|
|-
|align="left"| || align="center"|F/C || align="left"|Minnesota || align="center"|3 || align="center"|– || 209 || 4,358 || 1,182 || 310 || 1,474 || 20.9 || 5.7 || 1.5 || 7.1 || align=center|
|-
|align="left"| || align="center"|C || align="left"|Central Michigan || align="center"|1 || align="center"| || 39 || 736 || 229 || 58 || 404 || 18.9 || 5.9 || 1.5 || 10.4 || align=center|
|-
|align="left"| || align="center"|F || align="left"|UCLA || align="center"|1 || align="center"| || 27 || 269 || 14 || 11 || 54 || 10.0 || 0.5 || 0.4 || 2.0 || align=center|
|-
|align="left"| || align="center"|G || align="left"|Boise State || align="center"|1 || align="center"| || 17 || 71 || 14 || 9 || 30 || 4.2 || 0.8 || 0.5 || 1.8 || align=center|
|-
|align="left"| || align="center"|F || align="left"|Duke || align="center"|3 || align="center"|– || 147 || 3,015 || 486 || 207 || 956 || 20.5 || 3.3 || 1.4 || 6.5 || align=center|
|-
|align="left"| || align="center"|F || align="left"|Longwood || align="center"|1 || align="center"| || 70 || 1,766 || 363 || 89 || 476 || 25.2 || 5.2 || 1.3 || 6.8 || align=center|
|-
|align="left"| || align="center"|G/F || align="left"|Southern Miss || align="center"|1 || align="center"| || 6 || 83 || 17 || 2 || 20 || 13.8 || 2.8 || 0.3 || 3.3 || align=center|
|-
|align="left"| || align="center"|G || align="left"|Stetson || align="center"|1 || align="center"| || 4 || 12 || 2 || 0 || 1 || 3.0 || 0.5 || 0.0 || 0.3 || align=center|
|-
|align="left"| || align="center"|G || align="left"|Western Carolina || align="center"|1 || align="center"| || 6 || 20 || 2 || 2 || 7 || 3.3 || 0.3 || 0.3 || 1.2 || align=center|
|-
|align="left"| || align="center"|G || align="left"|Tulsa || align="center"|3 || align="center"|– || 213 || 3,932 || 531 || 511 || 1,290 || 18.5 || 2.5 || 2.4 || 6.1 || align=center|
|-
|align="left"| || align="center"|C || align="left"|Arkansas || align="center"|1 || align="center"| || 8 || 30 || 9 || 0 || 6 || 3.8 || 1.1 || 0.0 || 0.8 || align=center|
|-
|align="left"| || align="center"|C || align="left"|UConn || align="center"|3 || align="center"|– || 171 || 2,091 || 576 || 93 || 607 || 12.2 || 3.4 || 0.5 || 3.5 || align=center|
|-
|align="left"| || align="center"|F/C || align="left"|SMU || align="center"|7 || align="center"|– || 515 || 10,661 || 3,177 || 429 || 4,128 || 20.7 || 6.2 || 0.8 || 8.0 || align=center|
|-
|align="left"| || align="center"|F/C || align="left"|Montana || align="center"|1 || align="center"| || 3 || 11 || 5 || 3 || 3 || 3.7 || 1.7 || 1.0 || 1.0 || align=center|
|-
|align="left"| || align="center"|F/C || align="left"|North Carolina || align="center"|4 || align="center"|– || 173 || 2,644 || 672 || 78 || 1,113 || 15.3 || 3.9 || 0.5 || 6.4 || align=center|
|-
|align="left"| || align="center"|F/C || align="left"|Michigan || align="center"|2 || align="center"|– || 98 || 963 || 222 || 58 || 411 || 9.8 || 2.3 || 0.6 || 4.2 || align=center|
|-
|align="left" | || align="center"|F || align="left"|Utah || align="center"|2 || align="center"|– || 147 || 4,715 || 865 || 319 || 2,550 || 32.1 || 5.9 || 2.2 || 17.3 || align=center|
|-
|align="left"| || align="center"|G || align="left"|Louisiana || align="center"|1 || align="center"| || 71 || 1,165 || 92 || 177 || 502 || 16.4 || 1.3 || 2.5 || 7.1 || align=center|
|-
|align="left"| || align="center"|G/F || align="left"|Virginia || align="center"|2 || align="center"|– || 40 || 183 || 34 || 15 || 62 || 4.6 || 0.9 || 0.4 || 1.6 || align=center|
|-
|align="left"| || align="center"|F/C || align="left"|Arizona State || align="center"|4 || align="center"|– || 206 || 2,950 || 1,069 || 85 || 970 || 14.3 || 5.2 || 0.4 || 4.7 || align=center|
|-
|align="left"| || align="center"|G || align="left"|Nebraska || align="center"|2 || align="center"|– || 109 || 2,283 || 269 || 234 || 773 || 20.9 || 2.5 || 2.1 || 7.1 || align=center|
|-
|align="left" bgcolor="#FFCC00"|+ || align="center"|F/C || align="left"|Dartmouth || align="center"|8 || align="center"|– || 582 || 18,886 || 5,571 || 1,215 || 8,231 || 32.5 || 9.6 || 2.1 || 14.1 || align=center|
|-
|align="left"| || align="center"|G || align="left"|Marquette || align="center"|1 || align="center"| || 11 || 31 || 8 || 9 || 14 || 2.8 || 0.7 || 0.8 || 1.3 || align=center|
|-
|align="left" bgcolor="#FFFF99"|^ || align="center"|G || align="left"|Indiana || align="center"|5 || align="center"|– || 324 || 8,289 || 950 || 906 || 2,852 || 25.6 || 2.9 || 2.8 || 8.8 || align=center|
|-
|align="left"| || align="center"|G || align="left"|Iowa || align="center"|2 || align="center"|– || 59 || 500 || 36 || 134 || 156 || 8.5 || 0.6 || 2.3 || 2.6 || align=center|
|-
|align="left"| || align="center"|G || align="left"|Harvard || align="center"|1 || align="center"| || 74 || 1,907 || 196 || 339 || 832 || 25.8 || 2.6 || 4.6 || 11.2 || align=center|
|-
|align="left"| || align="center"|C || align="left"|Stanford || align="center"|1 || align="center"| || 74 || 1,735 || 294 || 126 || 961 || 23.4 || 4.0 || 1.7 || 13.0 || align=center|
|-
|align="left"| || align="center"|F || align="left"|Oregon || align="center"|2 || align="center"|– || 81 || 1,129 || 267 || 74 || 504 || 13.9 || 3.3 || 0.9 || 6.2 || align=center|
|-
|align="left" bgcolor="#FFFF99"|^ || align="center"|F/C || align="left"|Kansas || align="center"|4 || align="center"|– || 282 || 8,626 || 3,145 || 454 || 4,859 || 30.6 || 11.2 || 1.6 || 17.2 || align=center|
|-
|align="left"| || align="center"|F/C || align="left"|Marquette || align="center"|1 || align="center"| || 77 || 1,750 || 566 || 84 || 785 || 22.7 || 7.4 || 1.1 || 10.2 || align=center|
|-
|align="left"| || align="center"|G || align="left"|Nebraska || align="center"|3 || align="center"|– || 61 || 802 || 50 || 87 || 253 || 13.1 || 0.8 || 1.4 || 4.1 || align=center|
|-
|align="left"| || align="center"|F || align="left"|North Carolina || align="center"|3 || align="center"|– || 203 || 3,727 || 803 || 209 || 1,313 || 18.4 || 4.0 || 1.0 || 6.5 || align=center|
|-
|align="left"| || align="center"|F || align="left"|UCLA || align="center"|1 || align="center"| || 44 || 403 || 64 || 30 || 119 || 9.2 || 1.5 || 0.7 || 2.7 || align=center|
|}

M

|-
|align="left"| || align="center"|G || align="left"|Iona || align="center"|1 || align="center"| || 4 || 19 || 0 || 3 || 10 || 4.8 || 0.0 || 0.8 || 2.5 || align=center|
|-
|align="left"| || align="center"|G || align="left"|East Carolina || align="center"|1 || align="center"| || 27 || 155 || 22 || 20 || 51 || 5.7 || 0.8 || 0.7 || 1.9 || align=center|
|-
|align="left"| || align="center"|F || align="left"|Stanford || align="center"|3 || align="center"|– || 183 || 2,072 || 473 || 106 || 478 || 11.3 || 2.6 || 0.6 || 2.6 || align=center|
|-
|align="left" bgcolor="#FFFF99"|^ || align="center"|F || align="left"|Louisiana Tech || align="center"|1 || align="center"| || 42 || 1,373 || 367 || 163 || 554 || 32.7 || 8.7 || 3.9 || 13.2 || align=center|
|-
|align="left"| || align="center"|G || align="left"|Northwestern || align="center"|1 || align="center"| || 10 || 71 || 6 || 9 || 21 || 7.1 || 0.6 || 0.9 || 2.1 || align=center|
|-
|align="left"| || align="center"|G || align="left"|North Carolina || align="center"|1 || align="center"| || 54 || 1,564 || 155 || 477 || 430 || 29.0 || 2.9 || 8.8 || 8.0 || align=center|
|-
|align="left" bgcolor="#FFFF99"|^ || align="center"|G || align="left"|Texas || align="center"|7 || align="center"|– || 484 || 13,130 || 1,346 || 2,007 || 4,813 || 37.6 || 3.2 || 4.1 || 9.9 || align=center|
|-
|align="left"| || align="center"|G || align="left"|Wisconsin || align="center"|2 || align="center"|– || 101 || 1,238 || 113 || 238 || 497 || 12.3 || 1.1 || 2.4 || 4.9 || align=center|
|-
|align="left"| || align="center"|C || align="left"| Spirou Gilly || align="center"|3 || align="center"|– || 98 || 732 || 159 || 23 || 230 || 7.5 || 1.6 || 0.2 || 2.3 || align=center|
|-
|align="left" bgcolor="#FFFF99"|^ || align="center"|F/C || align="left"|North Carolina || align="center"|4 || align="center"|– || 224 || 4,475 || 990 || 212 || 2,701 || 20.0 || 4.4 || 0.9 || 12.1 || align=center|
|-
|align="left"| || align="center"|F || align="left"|Purdue || align="center"|1 || align="center"| || 13 || 65 || 6 || 2 || 22 || 5.0 || 0.5 || 0.2 || 1.7 || align=center|
|-
|align="left"| || align="center"|G || align="left"|Drake || align="center"|2 || align="center"|– || 116 || 2,230 || 205 || 219 || 847 || 19.2 || 1.8 || 1.9 || 7.3 || align=center|
|-
|align="left"| || align="center"|G/F || align="left"|Florida State || align="center"|1 || align="center"| || 23 || 286 || 36 || 17 || 95 || 12.4 || 1.6 || 0.7 || 4.1 || align=center|
|-
|align="left"| || align="center"|C || align="left"|UCLA || align="center"|1 || align="center"| || 21 || 104 || 25 || 7 || 26 || 5.0 || 1.2 || 0.3 || 1.2 || align=center|
|-
|align="left"| || align="center"|F/C || align="left"|Western Kentucky || align="center"|1 || align="center"| || 35 || 242 || 74 || 15 || 91 || 6.9 || 2.1 || 0.4 || 2.6 || align=center|
|-
|align="left" | || align="center"|C || align="left"|Nevada || align="center"|1 || align="center"| || 75 || 1,671 || 566 || 52 || 897 || 22.3 || 7.5 || 0.7 || 12.0 || align=center|
|-
|align="left"| || align="center"|G/F || align="left"|Michigan || align="center"|5 || align="center"|– || 302 || 4,541 || 600 || 277 || 2,465 || 15.0 || 2.0 || 0.9 || 8.2 || align=center|
|-
|align="left"| || align="center"|F/C || align="left"|Utah || align="center"|1 || align="center"| || 8 || 37 || 12 || 3 || 15 || 4.6 || 1.5 || 0.4 || 1.9 || align=center|
|-
|align="left"| || align="center"|G/F || align="left"|Creighton || align="center"|1 || align="center"| || 36 || 237 || 29 || 14 || 67 || 6.6 || 0.8 || 0.4 || 1.9 || align=center|
|-
|align="left"| || align="center"|G || align="left"|Temple || align="center"|2 || align="center"|– || 24 || 252 || 38 || 24 || 29 || 10.5 || 1.6 || 1.0 || 1.2 || align=center|
|-
|align="left"| || align="center"|F || align="left"|Columbia || align="center"|3 || align="center"|– || 242 || 7,750 || 1,299 || 563 || 3,714 || 32.0 || 5.4 || 2.3 || 15.3 || align=center|
|-
|align="left"| || align="center"|F/C || align="left"|California || align="center"|2 || align="center"|– || 72 || 508 || 163 || 13 || 215 || 7.1 || 2.3 || 0.2 || 3.0 || align=center|
|-
|align="left"| || align="center"|G || align="left"|Saint Joseph's || align="center"|1 || align="center"| || 29 || 229 || 23 || 40 || 52 || 7.9 || 0.8 || 1.4 || 1.8 || align=center|
|-
|align="left"| || align="center"|F || align="left"|Duke || align="center"|1 || align="center"| || 50 || 718 || 171 || 51 || 138 || 14.4 || 3.4 || 1.0 || 2.8 || align=center|
|-
|align="left"| || align="center"|F || align="left"| Budivelnyk || align="center"|6 || align="center"|– || 249 || 3,259 || 730 || 134 || 1,348 || 13.1 || 2.9 || 0.5 || 5.4 || align=center|
|-
|align="left"| || align="center"|G || align="left"|Kentucky || align="center"|2 || align="center"|– || 155 || 4,219 || 365 || 207 || 1,827 || 27.2 || 2.4 || 1.3 || 11.8 || align=center|
|-
|align="left"| || align="center"|F/C || align="left"|Colorado || align="center"|1 || align="center"| || 20 || 139 || 45 || 9 || 64 || 7.0 || 2.3 || 0.5 || 3.2 || align=center|
|-
|align="left"| || align="center"|G || align="left"|Minnesota || align="center"|2 || align="center"|– || 141 || 2,821 || 347 || 333 || 983 || 20.0 || 2.5 || 2.4 || 7.0 || align=center|
|-
|align="left"| || align="center"|C || align="left"|Texas || align="center"|4 || align="center"|–– || 175 || 3,794 || 986 || 134 || 1,457 || 21.7 || 5.6 || 0.8 || 8.3 || align=center|
|-
|align="left" bgcolor="#FFFF99"|^ || align="center"|C || align="left"|DePaul || align="center"|7 || align="center"|– || 439 || 8,350 || 4,167 || 1,245 || 10,156 || 34.4 || 13.4 || 2.8 || 23.1 || align=center|
|-
|align="left" bgcolor="#FFFF99"|^ || align="center"|F/C || align="left"|Hamline || align="center"|10 || align="center"|– || 699 || 18,443 || 5,940 || 1,515 || 10,063 || 32.5 || 9.4 || 2.2 || 14.4 || align=center|
|-
|align="left"| || align="center"|F || align="left"|Michigan State || align="center"|2 || align="center"|– || 73 || 650 || 177 || 39 || 225 || 8.9 || 2.4 || 0.5 || 3.1 || align=center|
|-
|align="left"| || align="center"|F || align="left"|Toledo || align="center"|1 || align="center"| || 1 || 17 || 1 || 2 || 9 || 17.0 || 1.0 || 2.0 || 9.0 || align=center|
|-
|align="left"| || align="center"|G || align="left"|Michigan || align="center"|2 || align="center"|– || 67 || 852 || 73 || 97 || 240 || 12.7 || 1.1 || 1.4 || 3.6 || align=center|
|-
|align="left"| || align="center"|F || align="left"|Gonzaga || align="center"|2 || align="center"|– || 39 || 285 || 40 || 21 || 84 || 7.3 || 1.0 || 0.5 || 2.2 || align=center|
|-
|align="left"| || align="center"|C || align="left"| BC Khimki || align="center"|1 || align="center"| || 54 || 1,104 || 264 || 43 || 401 || 20.4 || 4.9 || 0.8 || 7.4 || align=center|
|-
|align="left"| || align="center"|F/C || align="left"|San Francisco || align="center"|1 || align="center"| || 39 || 973 || 222 || 78 || 325 || 24.9 || 5.7 || 2.0 || 8.3 || align=center|
|-
|align="left"| || align="center"|G || align="left"|Louisville || align="center"|1 || align="center"| || 2 || 18 || 4 || 0 || 5 || 9.0 || 2.0 || 0.0 || 2.5 || align=center|
|-
|align="left"| || align="center"|F/C || align="left"|Notre Dame || align="center"|1 || align="center"| || 59 || 956 || 191 || 51 || 188 || 16.2 || 3.2 || 0.9 || 3.2 || align=center|
|-
|align="left"| || align="center"|F || align="left"|UCLA || align="center"|1 || align="center"| || 31 || 193 || 23 || 12 || 61 || 6.2 || 0.7 || 0.4 || 2.0 || align=center|
|-
|align="left"| || align="center"|F/C || align="left"|Bucknell || align="center"|1 || align="center"| || 17 || 265 || 44 || 14 || 100 || 15.6 || 2.6 || 0.8 || 5.9 || align=center|
|-
|align="left"| || align="center"|G/F || align="left"|Kansas || align="center"|1 || align="center"| || 39 || 420 || 34 || 33 || 127 || 10.8 || 0.9 || 0.8 || 3.3 || align=center|
|}

N to P

|-
|align="left"| || align="center"|F/C || align="left"|Wyoming || align="center"|3 || align="center"|– || 168 || 3,630 || 965 || 197 || 1,158 || 21.6 || 5.7 || 1.2 || 6.9 || align=center|
|-
|align="left"| || align="center"|F || align="left"|Kentucky || align="center"|1 || align="center"| || 25 || 167 || 35 || 10 || 53 || 6.7 || 1.4 || 0.4 || 2.1 || align=center|
|-
|align="left" bgcolor="#FFFF99"|^ || align="center"|G || align="left"|Santa Clara || align="center"|2 || align="center"|– || 65 || 1,940 || 171 || 419 || 738 || 29.8 || 2.6 || 6.4 || 11.4 || align=center|
|-
|align="left"| || align="center"|C || align="left"|UCLA || align="center"|1 || align="center"| || 69 || 829 || 264 || 27 || 311 || 12.0 || 3.8 || 0.4 || 4.5 || align=center|
|-
|align="left" bgcolor="#FFFF99"|^ || align="center"|F || align="left"|Iowa || align="center"|2 || align="center"|– || 119 || 1,644 || 396 || 100 || 511 || 13.8 || 3.3 || 0.8 || 4.3 || align=center|
|-
|align="left"| || align="center"|G/F || align="left"|Ole Miss || align="center"|1 || align="center"| || 59 || 888 || 63 || 137 || 346 || 15.1 || 1.1 || 2.3 || 5.9 || align=center|
|-
|align="left"| || align="center"|C || align="left"|NC State || align="center"|2 || align="center"|– || 15 || 84 || 27 || 5 || 22 || 5.6 || 1.8 || 0.3 || 1.5 || align=center|
|-
|align="left"| || align="center"|F || align="left"|Miami (OH) || align="center"|1 || align="center"| || 6 || 31 || 11 || 3 || 7 || 5.2 || 1.8 || 0.5 || 1.2 || align=center|
|-
|align="left" bgcolor="#FFCC00"|+ || align="center"|G || align="left"|Duquesne || align="center"|6 || align="center"|– || 485 || 17,847 || 1,312 || 3,846 || 7,938 || 36.8 || 2.7 || 7.9 || 16.4 || align=center|
|-
|align="left"| || align="center"|G || align="left"|Cal Poly || align="center"|1 || align="center"| || 20 || 397 || 63 || 14 || 120 || 19.9 || 3.2 || 0.7 || 6.0 || align=center|
|-
|align="left"| || align="center"|F || align="left"|Rhode Island || align="center"|7 || align="center"|– || 519 || 18,204 || 4,906 || 1,944 || 7,092 || 35.1 || 9.5 || 3.7 || 13.7 || align=center|
|-
|align="left"| || align="center"|C || align="left"|Seattle || align="center"|1 || align="center"| || 3 || 9 || 1 || 1 || 5 || 3.0 || 0.3 || 0.3 || 1.7 || align=center|
|-
|align="left" bgcolor="#FFFF99"|^ (#34) || align="center"|C || align="left"|LSU || align="center"|8 || align="center"|– || 514 || 19,329 || 6,090 || 1,593 || 13,895 || 37.6 || 11.8 || 3.1 || 27.0 || align=center|
|-
|align="left"| || align="center"|G || align="left"|Notre Dame || align="center"|1 || align="center"| || 63 ||  || 125 || 100 || 271 ||  || 2.0 || 1.6 || 4.3 || align=center|
|-
|align="left"| || align="center"|F || align="left"|UCLA || align="center"|1 || align="center"| || 20 || 80 || 15 || 3 || 26 || 4.0 || 0.8 || 0.2 || 1.3 || align=center|
|-
|align="left"| || align="center"|G || align="left"|Arkansas || align="center"|2 || align="center"|– || 47 || 405 || 43 || 50 || 99 || 8.6 || 0.9 || 1.1 || 2.1 || align=center|
|-
|align="left"| || align="center"|G || align="left"|Fordham || align="center"|2 || align="center"|– || 164 || 5,230 || 477 || 530 || 1,848 || 31.9 || 2.9 || 3.2 || 11.3 || align=center|
|-
|align="left"| || align="center"|F || align="left"|Auburn || align="center"|1 || align="center"| || 3 || 9 || 2 || 1 || 5 || 3.0 || 0.7 || 0.3 || 1.7 || align=center|
|-
|align="left"| || align="center"|F || align="left"|Cincinnati || align="center"|1 || align="center"| || 24 || 144 || 30 || 2 || 65 || 6.0 || 1.3 || 0.1 || 2.7 || align=center|
|-
|align="left"| || align="center"|G/F || align="left"|Dayton || align="center"|1 || align="center"| || 71 || 1,274 || 266 || 86 || 446 || 17.9 || 3.7 || 1.2 || 6.3 || align=center|
|-
|align="left" bgcolor="#FFFF99"|^ || align="center"|G || align="left"|Oregon State || align="center"|1 || align="center"| || 82 || 2,825 || 342 || 449 || 1,199 || 34.5 || 4.2 || 5.5 || 14.6 || align=center|
|-
|align="left"| || align="center"|G || align="left"|Oregon State || align="center"|1 || align="center"| || 11 || 115 || 27 || 12 || 39 || 10.5 || 2.5 || 1.1 || 3.5 || align=center|
|-
|align="left"| || align="center"|G || align="left"|Missouri || align="center"|4 || align="center"|– || 253 || 5,746 || 593 || 500 || 2,691 || 22.7 || 2.3 || 2.0 || 10.6 || align=center|
|-
|align="left"| || align="center"|G || align="left"|Master's College || align="center"|2 || align="center"|– || 56 || 863 || 65 || 73 || 272 || 15.4 || 1.2 || 1.3 || 4.9 || align=center|
|-
|align="left"| || align="center"|F/C || align="left"|North Carolina || align="center"|3 || align="center"|– || 185 || 6,425 || 1,473 || 377 || 2,697 || 34.7 || 8.0 || 2.0 || 14.6 || align=center|
|-
|align="left"| || align="center"|F || align="left"|Wyoming || align="center"|1 || align="center"| || 9 || 41 || 9 || 2 || 5 || 4.6 || 1.0 || 0.2 || 0.6 || align=center|
|-
|align="left" bgcolor="#FFFF99"|^ || align="center"|F/C || align="left"|Stanford || align="center"|7 || align="center"|– || 438 || 9,391 || 2,487 || 1,417 || 5,762 || 35.4 || 7.8 || 3.2 || 13.2 || align=center|
|-
|align="left"| || align="center"|F || align="left"|NC State || align="center"|2 || align="center"|– || 123 || 1,284 || 292 || 62 || 419 || 10.4 || 2.4 || 0.5 || 3.4 || align=center|
|-
|align="left"| || align="center"|G || align="left"|Louisville || align="center"|4 || align="center"|– || 225 || 5,002 || 659 || 747 || 2,227 || 22.2 || 2.9 || 3.3 || 9.9 || align=center|
|-
|align="left"| || align="center"|G || align="left"|Utah Valley || align="center"|1 || align="center"| || 43 || 982 || 69 || 165 || 221 || 22.8 || 1.6 || 3.8 || 5.1 || align=center|
|-
|align="left"| || align="center"|G/F || align="left"|Maryland || align="center"|1 || align="center"| || 25 || 279 || 43 || 15 || 104 || 11.2 || 1.7 || 0.6 || 4.2 || align=center|
|}

R

|-
|align="left"| || align="center"|F || align="left"| Crvena zvezda || align="center"|3 || align="center"|– || 166 || 3,240 || 512 || 227 || 1,177 || 19.5 || 3.1 || 1.4 || 7.1 || align=center|
|-
|align="left"| || align="center"|F || align="left"|Santa Clara || align="center"|9 || align="center"|–– || 569 || 10,059 || 3,134 || 483 || 2,816 || 17.7 || 5.5 || 0.8 || 4.9 || align=center|
|-
|align="left"| || align="center"|F/C || align="left"|Kentucky || align="center"|4 || align="center"|– || 238 || 6,622 || 2,119 || 618 || 3,219 || 27.8 || 8.9 || 2.6 || 13.5 || align=center|
|-
|align="left"| || align="center"|F/C || align="left"|Wyoming || align="center"|1 || align="center"| || 10 || 71 || 13 || 3 || 2 || 7.1 || 1.3 || 0.3 || 0.2 || align=center|
|-
|align="left"| || align="center"|F/C || align="left"|Oklahoma City || align="center"|1 || align="center"| || 46 || 386 || 107 || 23 || 76 || 8.4 || 2.3 || 0.5 || 1.7 || align=center|
|-
|align="left"| || align="center"|F || align="left"|North Carolina || align="center"|1 || align="center"| || 25 || 473 || 99 || 23 || 126 || 18.9 || 4.0 || 0.9 || 5.0 || align=center|
|-
|align="left"| || align="center"|F || align="left"|Michigan || align="center"|2 || align="center"|– || 107 || 3,515 || 426 || 247 || 1,744 || 32.9 || 4.0 || 2.3 || 16.3 || align=center|
|-
|align="left" bgcolor="#FFFF99"|^ || align="center"|G || align="left"|Kansas State || align="center"|1 || align="center"| || 64 || 709 || 94 || 57 || 260 || 11.1 || 1.5 || 0.9 || 4.1 || align=center|
|-
|align="left"| || align="center"|G || align="left"|UNLV || align="center"|1 || align="center"| || 67 || 1,206 || 156 || 111 || 507 || 18.0 || 2.3 || 1.7 || 7.6 || align=center|
|-
|align="left" bgcolor="#FFFF99"|^ || align="center"|G/F || align="left"|Kentucky || align="center"|6 || align="center"|– || 296 || 4,633 || 462 || 497 || 2,316 || 15.7 || 1.6 || 1.7 || 7.8 || align=center|
|-
|align="left"| || align="center"|G || align="left"|Notre Dame || align="center"|1 || align="center"| || 47 || 440 || 43 || 106 || 134 || 9.4 || 0.9 || 2.3 || 2.9 || align=center|
|-
|align="left"| || align="center"|F/C || align="left"|Cincinnati || align="center"|2 || align="center"|– || 139 || 2,914 || 976 || 139 || 982 || 21.0 || 7.0 || 1.0 || 7.1 || align=center|
|-
|align="left"| || align="center"|F/C || align="left"|BYU || align="center"|1 || align="center"| || 33 || 317 || 47 || 26 || 122 || 9.6 || 1.4 || 0.8 || 3.7 || align=center|
|-
|align="left"| || align="center"|F/C || align="left"|Utah State || align="center"|1 || align="center"| || 28 || 209 || 25 || 19 || 58 || 7.5 || 0.9 || 0.7 || 2.1 || align=center|
|-
|align="left"| || align="center"|F || align="left"|USC || align="center"|1 || align="center"| || 9 || 78 || 19 || 9 || 29 || 8.7 || 2.1 || 1.0 || 3.2 || align=center|
|-
|align="left"| || align="center"|G || align="left"|Wyoming || align="center"|2 || align="center"|– || 70 || 1,054 || 122 || 146 || 669 || 15.1 || 1.7 || 2.1 || 9.6 || align=center|
|-
|align="left"| || align="center"|G || align="left"|Michigan || align="center"|1 || align="center"| || 15 || 126 || 10 || 13 || 45 || 8.4 || 0.7 || 0.9 || 3.0 || align=center|
|-
|align="left"| || align="center"|F || align="left"|Kansas || align="center"|1 || align="center"| || 48 || 560 || 223 || 31 || 241 || 11.7 || 4.6 || 0.6 || 5.0 || align=center|
|-
|align="left"| || align="center"|F/C || align="left"|Kansas || align="center"|2 || align="center"|– || 135 || 1,898 || 464 || 137 || 644 || 14.1 || 3.4 || 1.0 || 4.8 || align=center|
|-
|align="left"| || align="center"|G || align="left"|South Carolina || align="center"|1 || align="center"| || 15 || 52 || 3 || 6 || 8 || 3.5 || 0.2 || 0.4 || 0.5 || align=center|
|-
|align="left" bgcolor="#FFFF99"|^ || align="center"|F || align="left"|Southeastern Oklahoma State || align="center"|1 || align="center"| || 23 || 657 || 258 || 30 || 49 || 28.6 || 11.2 || 1.3 || 2.1 || align=center|
|-
|align="left" | || align="center"|G || align="left"|Kentucky || align="center"|3 || align="center"|-- || 46 || 1,369 || 243 || 367 || 424 || 29.8 || 5.3 || 8.0 || 9.2 || align=center|
|-
|align="left"| || align="center"|C || align="left"|Arizona || align="center"|3 || align="center"|– || 146 || 1,475 || 353 || 75 || 502 || 10.1 || 2.4 || 0.5 || 3.4 || align=center|
|-
|align="left"| || align="center"|G || align="left"|Missouri || align="center"|3 || align="center"|– || 162 || 2,207 || 201 || 130 || 698 || 13.6 || 1.2 || 0.8 || 4.3 || align=center|
|-
|align="left"| || align="center"|F || align="left"|Long Beach State || align="center"|1 || align="center"| || 72 || 945 || 146 || 71 || 289 || 13.1 || 2.0 || 1.0 || 4.0 || align=center|
|-
|align="left"| || align="center"|G/F || align="left"|Michigan || align="center"|3 || align="center"|– || 196 || 5,263 || 592 || 441 || 2,847 || 26.9 || 3.0 || 2.3 || 14.5 || align=center|
|-
|align="left"| || align="center"|G || align="left"|Ohio State || align="center"|2 || align="center"|– || 143 || 4,070 || 495 || 569 || 2,038 || 28.5 || 3.5 || 4.0 || 14.3 || align=center|
|}

S

|-
|align="left"| || align="center"|C || align="left"|Gonzaga || align="center"|4 || align="center"|– || 189 || 2,745 || 593 || 126 || 787 || 14.5 || 3.1 || 0.7 || 4.2 || align=center|
|-
|align="left"| || align="center"|F/C || align="left"|Georgia Tech || align="center"|1 || align="center"| || 45 || 303 || 65 || 26 || 71 || 6.7 || 1.4 || 0.6 || 1.6 || align=center|
|-
|align="left"| || align="center"|C || align="left"|Cincinnati Stuff || align="center"|1 || align="center"| || 13 || 77 || 23 || 4 || 22 || 5.9 || 1.8 || 0.3 || 1.7 || align=center|
|-
|align="left"| || align="center"|F/C || align="left"|California || align="center"|1 || align="center"| || 10 || 130 || 52 || 7 || 29 || 13.0 || 5.2 || 0.7 || 2.9 || align=center|
|-
|align="left"| || align="center"|G/F || align="left"|Seton Hall || align="center"|3 || align="center"|– || 166 || 4,360 || 300 || 317 || 1,183 || 26.3 || 2.1 || 1.9 || 7.1 || align=center|
|-
|align="left"| || align="center"|G/F || align="left"|Indiana || align="center"|2 || align="center"|– || 123 ||  ||  || 388 || 932 ||  ||  || 3.2 || 7.6 || align=center|
|-
|align="left"| || align="center"|F/C || align="left"|Syracuse || align="center"|1 || align="center"| || 13 || 133 || 34 || 8 || 36 || 10.2 || 2.6 || 0.6 || 2.8 || align=center|
|-
|align="left"| || align="center"|F || align="left"|Ohio State || align="center"|5 || align="center"|– || 335 || 6,744 || 1,219 || 438 || 2,735 || 20.1 || 3.6 || 1.3 || 8.2 || align=center|
|-
|align="left"| || align="center"|F/C || align="left"|Hamline || align="center"|2 || align="center"|– || 106 || 1,775 || 326 || 131 || 359 || 16.7 || 3.1 || 1.2 || 3.4 || align=center|
|-
|align="left"| || align="center"|G || align="left"|Arizona State || align="center"|11 || align="center"|– || 846 || 25,533 || 2,534 || 2,365 || 12,780 || 30.2 || 3.0 || 2.8 || 15.1 || align=center|
|-
|align="left" bgcolor="#FFFF99"|^ || align="center"|G/F || align="left"|North Carolina || align="center"|1 || align="center"| || 48 || 1,393 || 148 || 235 || 560 || 29.0 || 3.1 || 4.9 || 11.7 || align=center|
|-
|align="left"| || align="center"|G || align="left"|Tulsa || align="center"|1 || align="center"| || 4 || 9 || 4 || 0 || 4 || 2.3 || 1.0 || 0.0 || 1.0 || align=center|
|-
|align="left" bgcolor="#FFCC00"|+ || align="center"|G/F || align="left"|Furman || align="center"|6 || align="center"|– || 364 || 9,936 || 1,301 || 1,157 || 3,756 || 27.3 || 3.6 || 3.2 || 10.3 || align=center|
|-
|align="left"| || align="center"|G || align="left"|Nevada || align="center"|1 || align="center"| || 23 || 701 || 87 || 142 || 291 || 30.5 || 3.8 || 6.2 || 12.7 || align=center|
|-
|align="left"| || align="center"|C || align="left"|Bowling Green || align="center"|1 || align="center"| || 3 ||  ||  ||  ||  ||  ||  ||  ||  || align=center|
|-
|align="left"| || align="center"|G || align="left"|UC Santa Barbara || align="center"|4 || align="center"|– || 284 || 4,613 || 751 || 651 || 1,145 || 16.2 || 2.6 || 2.3 || 4.0 || align=center|
|-
|align="left"| || align="center"|G/F || align="left"|Pepperdine || align="center"|1 || align="center"| || 19 || 171 || 27 || 12 || 63 || 9.0 || 1.4 || 0.6 || 3.3 || align=center|
|-
|align="left"| || align="center"|G || align="left"|Minnesota || align="center"|6 || align="center"|– || 341 || 9,193 || 1,133 || 903 || 2,800 || 27.0 || 3.3 || 2.6 || 8.2 || align=center|
|-
|align="left"| || align="center"|G || align="left"|West Virginia || align="center"|2 || align="center"| || 13 || 137 || 33 || 14 || 37 || 10.5 || 2.5 || 1.1 || 2.8 || align=center|
|-
|align="left"| || align="center"|G/F || align="left"|Minnesota || align="center"|1 || align="center"| || 8 ||  ||  || 2 || 6 ||  ||  || 0.3 || 0.8 || align=center|
|-
|align="left"| || align="center"|C || align="left"|Kentucky State || align="center"|2 || align="center"|– || 155 || 5,263 || 1,716 || 295 || 1,819 || 34.0 || 11.1 || 1.9 || 11.7 || align=center|
|-
|align="left"| || align="center"|F || align="left"|Maryland || align="center"|1 || align="center"| || 12 || 44 || 18 || 3 || 6 || 3.7 || 1.5 || 0.3 || 0.5 || align=center|
|-
|align="left"| || align="center"|G || align="left"|Marquette || align="center"|5 || align="center"|– || 316 || 4,908 || 536 || 557 || 1,824 || 15.5 || 1.7 || 1.8 || 5.8 || align=center|
|-
|align="left"| || align="center"|C || align="left"|Canisius || align="center"|2 || align="center"|– || 83 || 654 || 122 || 13 || 208 || 7.9 || 1.5 || 0.2 || 2.5 || align=center|
|-
|align="left"| || align="center"|G || align="left"|DePaul || align="center"|1 || align="center"| || 1 || 13 || 2 || 2 || 2 || 13.0 || 2.0 || 2.0 || 2.0 || align=center|
|-
|align="left"| || align="center"|G || align="left"|Villanova || align="center"|1 || align="center"| || 42 || 471 || 27 || 79 || 124 || 11.2 || 0.6 || 1.9 || 3.0 || align=center|
|-
|align="left"| || align="center"|C || align="left"|Western Kentucky || align="center"|1 || align="center"| || 50 || 1,098 || 281 || 51 || 382 || 22.0 || 5.6 || 1.0 || 7.6 || align=center|
|-
|align="left"| || align="center"|F || align="left"|Howard || align="center"|3 || align="center"|– || 156 || 2,126 || 369 || 211 || 838 || 13.6 || 2.4 || 1.4 || 5.4 || align=center|
|-
|align="left"| || align="center"|G/F || align="left"|Cincinnati || align="center"|1 || align="center"| || 68 || 1,123 || 215 || 140 || 491 || 16.5 || 3.2 || 2.1 || 7.2 || align=center|
|-
|align="left"| || align="center"|F || align="left"|Xavier || align="center"|1 || align="center"| || 63 || 746 || 178 || 32 || 214 || 11.8 || 2.8 || 0.5 || 3.4 || align=center|
|-
|align="left"| || align="center"|G/F || align="left"|DePaul || align="center"|1 || align="center"| || 23 ||  ||  || 23 || 61 ||  ||  || 1.0 || 2.7 || align=center|
|-
|align="left"|Sun Yue || align="center"|G || align="left"| Beijing Olympians || align="center"|1 || align="center"| || 10 || 28 || 0 || 2 || 6 || 2.8 || 0.0 || 0.2 || 0.6 || align=center|
|-
|align="left"| || align="center"|G || align="left"|Illinois || align="center"|1 || align="center"| || 45 || 404 || 56 || 37 || 114 || 9.0 || 1.2 || 0.8 || 2.5 || align=center|
|}

T to Z

|-
|align="left"| || align="center"|G/F || align="left"|Marquette || align="center"|2 || align="center"|– || 93 || 1,912 || 326 || 188 || 989 || 20.6 || 3.5 || 2.0 || 10.6 || align=center|
|-
|align="left"| || align="center"|G/F || align="left"|Baylor || align="center"|2 || align="center"|– || 164 || 3,100 || 364 || 195 || 1,695 || 18.9 || 2.2 || 1.2 || 10.3 || align=center|
|-
|align="left"| || align="center"|F || align="left"|Florida State || align="center"|1 || align="center"| || 26 || 108 || 31 || 10 || 46 || 4.2 || 1.2 || 0.4 || 1.8 || align=center|
|-
|align="left"| || align="center"|G || align="left"|Washington || align="center"|1 || align="center"| || 17 || 456 || 36 || 85 || 265 || 26.8 || 2.1 || 5.0 || 15.6 || align=center|
|-
|align="left"| || align="center"|F || align="left"|Louisville || align="center"|2 || align="center"|– || 68 || 800 || 180 || 61 || 346 || 11.8 || 2.6 || 0.9 || 5.1 || align=center|
|-
|align="left"| || align="center"|F/C || align="left"|Minnesota || align="center"|5 || align="center"|– || 335 || 7,641 || 1,797 || 206 || 2,990 || 22.8 || 5.4 || 0.6 || 8.9 || align=center|
|-
|align="left"| || align="center"|G || align="left"|West Virginia Tech || align="center"|5 || align="center"|– || 386 || 11,312 || 898 || 2,018 || 4,594 || 29.3 || 2.3 || 5.2 || 11.9 || align=center|
|-
|align="left"| || align="center"|F || align="left"|Kentucky || align="center"|1 || align="center"| || 2 ||  ||  || 1 || 2 ||  ||  || 0.5 || 1.0 || align=center|
|-
|align="left"| || align="center"|F || align="left"|Indiana || align="center"|1 || align="center"| || 14 || 82 || 20 || 5 || 42 || 5.9 || 1.4 || 0.4 || 3.0 || align=center|
|-
|align="left"| || align="center"|F || align="left"|UNLV || align="center"|2 || align="center"|– || 63 || 794 || 194 || 44 || 342 || 12.6 || 3.1 || 0.7 || 5.4 || align=center|
|-
|align="left"| || align="center"|F/C || align="left"|Seattle || align="center"|2 || align="center"|– || 28 || 287 || 86 || 27 || 160 || 10.3 || 3.1 || 1.0 || 5.7 || align=center|
|-
|align="left"| || align="center"|F || align="left"|Gonzaga || align="center"|3 || align="center"|– || 173 || 2,706 || 602 || 199 || 944 || 15.6 || 3.5 || 1.2 || 5.5 || align=center|
|-
|align="left"| || align="center"|F || align="left"|Akron || align="center"|1 || align="center"| || 19 || 117 || 25 || 11 || 38 || 6.2 || 1.3 || 0.6 || 2.0 || align=center|
|-
|align="left"| || align="center"|F || align="left"|Portland State || align="center"|1 || align="center"| || 4 || 28 || 5 || 2 || 8 || 7.0 || 1.3 || 0.5 || 2.0 || align=center|
|-
|align="left" bgcolor="#FFCC00"|+ || align="center"|G || align="left"|Cincinnati || align="center"|5 || align="center"|– || 378 || 13,147 || 1,062 || 2,749 || 5,633 || 34.8 || 2.8 || 7.3 || 14.9 || align=center|
|-
|align="left"| || align="center"|F || align="left"|Michigan State || align="center"|1 || align="center"| || 24 || 200 || 26 || 10 || 90 || 8.3 || 1.1 || 0.4 || 3.8 || align=center|
|-
|align="left"| || align="center"|G || align="left"| Amatori Udine || align="center"|7 || align="center"|– || 420 || 5,988 || 700 || 485 || 2,033 || 14.3 || 1.7 || 1.2 || 4.8 || align=center|
|-
|align="left"| || align="center"|G || align="left"|Florida State || align="center"|1 || align="center"| || 16 || 73 || 8 || 4 || 20 || 4.6 || 0.5 || 0.3 || 1.3 || align=center|
|-
|align="left"| || align="center"|G || align="left"|Louisville || align="center"|1 || align="center"| || 40 || 380 || 28 || 61 || 152 || 9.5 || 0.7 || 1.5 || 3.8 || align=center|
|-
|align="left"| || align="center"|F/C || align="left"|Michigan || align="center"|1 || align="center"| || 43 || 446 || 85 || 24 || 207 || 10.4 || 2.0 || 0.6 || 4.8 || align=center|
|-
|align="left"| || align="center"|F || align="left"|Louisville || align="center"|2 || align="center"|– || 136 || 2,898 || 849 || 128 || 756 || 21.3 || 6.2 || 0.9 || 5.6 || align=center|
|-
|align="left"| || align="center"|G/F || align="left"|Tennessee || align="center"|1 || align="center"| || 22 ||  ||  || 10 || 75 ||  ||  || 0.5 || 3.4 || align=center|
|-
|align="left"| || align="center"|F || align="left"|Arizona || align="center"|9 || align="center"|– || 493 || 8,529 || 1,408 || 1,121 || 2,434 || 17.3 || 2.9 || 2.3 || 4.9 || align=center|
|-
|align="left"| || align="center"|F/C || align="left"|Jackson State || align="center"|2 || align="center"|– || 95 || 2,682 || 791 || 117 || 645 || 28.2 || 8.3 || 1.2 || 6.8 || align=center|
|-
|align="left"| || align="center"|F/C || align="left"|American || align="center"|5 || align="center"|– || 214 || 3,934 || 1,433 || 183 || 1,343 || 18.4 || 6.7 || 0.9 || 6.3 || align=center|
|-
|align="left"| || align="center"|G || align="left"|Kentucky || align="center"|1 || align="center"| ||  ||  ||  ||  ||  ||  ||  ||  ||  || align=center|
|-
|align="left"| || align="center"|F || align="left"|UCLA || align="center"|1 || align="center"| || 17 || 228 || 38 || 7 || 75 || 13.4 || 2.2 || 0.4 || 4.4 || align=center|
|-
|align="left"| || align="center"|C || align="left"|Kansas || align="center"|1 || align="center"| || 1 || 7 || 1 || 1 || 4 || 7.0 || 1.0 || 1.0 || 4.0 || align=center|
|-
|align="left" bgcolor="#FFFF99"|^ (#44) || align="center"|G || align="left"|West Virginia || align="center"|14 || align="center"|– || 932 || 36,571 || 5,366 || 6,238 || 25,192 || 39.2 || 5.8 || 6.7 || 27.0 || align=center|
|-
|align="left"| || align="center"|G/F || align="left"|Virginia Tech || align="center"|1 || align="center"| || 38 || 434 || 84 || 51 || 139 || 11.4 || 2.2 || 1.3 || 3.7 || align=center|
|-
|align="left"| || align="center"|C || align="left"|Wichita State || align="center"|4 || align="center"|– || 300 || 6,386 || 2,194 || 252 || 1,273 || 21.3 || 7.3 || 0.8 || 4.2 || align=center|
|-
|align="left" bgcolor="#FFFF99"|^ (#52) || align="center"|G/F || align="left"|UCLA || align="center"|8 || align="center"|– || 575 || 19,270 || 3,119 || 1,474 || 10,601 || 33.5 || 5.4 || 2.6 || 18.4 || align=center|
|-
|align="left"| || align="center"|F || align="left"|Florida A&M || align="center"|2 || align="center"|– || 24 || 193 || 59 || 7 || 70 || 8.0 || 2.5 || 0.3 || 2.9 || align=center|
|-
|align="left"| || align="center"|F || align="left"|Arizona || align="center"|1 || align="center"| || 2 || 9 || 1 || 0 || 2 || 4.5 || 0.5 || 0.0 || 1.0 || align=center|
|-
|align="left"| || align="center"|F || align="left"|Gonzaga || align="center"|1 || align="center"| || 24 || 372 || 99 || 13 || 157 || 15.5 || 4.1 || 0.5 || 6.5 || align=center|
|-
|align="left"| || align="center"|G || align="left"|South Gwinnett HS (GA) || align="center"|2 || align="center"|– || 125 || 3,310 || 301 || 350 || 2,106 || 26.5 || 2.4 || 2.8 || 16.8 || align=center|
|-
|align="left"| || align="center"|G || align="left"|West Virginia || align="center"|1 || align="center"| || 9 || 158 || 19 || 21 || 44 || 17.6 || 2.1 || 2.3 || 4.9 || align=center|
|-
|align="left"| || align="center"|G || align="left"|North Carolina || align="center"|1 || align="center"| || 30 || 345 || 40 || 31 || 94 || 11.5 || 1.3 || 1.0 || 3.1 || align=center|
|-
|align="left"| || align="center"|F || align="left"|Memphis || align="center"|1 || align="center"| || 36 || 751 || 167 || 30 || 202 || 20.9 || 4.6 || 0.8 || 5.6 || align=center|
|-
|align="left"| || align="center"|F || align="left"|UCLA || align="center"|1 || align="center"| || 5 || 126 || 28 || 12 || 51 || 25.2 || 5.6 || 2.4 || 10.2 || align=center|
|-
|align="left"| || align="center"|G/F || align="left"|South Carolina || align="center"|1 || align="center"| || 68 || 1,516 || 138 || 195 || 794 || 22.3 || 2.0 || 2.9 || 11.7 || align=center|
|-
|align="left"| || align="center"|F || align="left"|St. John's || align="center"|6 || align="center"|–– || 358 || 10,015 || 1,297 || 699 || 3,197 || 28.0 || 3.6 || 2.0 || 8.9 || align=center|
|-
|align="left"| || align="center"|F || align="left"|Notre Dame || align="center"|2 || align="center"|– || 136 || 2,912 || 455 || 154 || 1,503 || 21.4 || 3.3 || 1.1 || 11.1 || align=center|
|-
|align="left" bgcolor="#FFFF99"|^ (#42) || align="center"|F || align="left"|North Carolina || align="center"|12 || align="center"|– || 926 || 30,001 || 4,708 || 2,791 || 16,320 || 32.4 || 5.1 || 3.0 || 17.6 || align=center|
|-
|align="left"| || align="center"|C || align="left"|Memphis || align="center"|1 || align="center"| || 37 || 263 || 94 || 16 || 72 || 7.1 || 2.5 || 0.4 || 1.9 || align=center|
|-
|align="left"| || align="center"|G/F || align="left"|USC || align="center"|4 || align="center"|– || 220 || 5,399 || 497 || 228 || 2,890 || 24.5 || 2.3 || 1.0 || 13.1 || align=center|
|-
|align="left"| || align="center"|C || align="left"| Cibona || align="center"|3 || align="center"|– || 114 || 1,535 || 444 || 80 || 726 || 13.5 || 3.9 || 0.7 || 6.4 || align=center|
|}

References
General

Specific

National Basketball Association all-time rosters
Los Angeles Lakers players
roster